The Ermita Nuestra Señora de la Candelaria del Plantaje is a former church (now ruins) in the municipality of Toa Baja, Puerto Rico.

The ruins were listed on the U.S. National Register of Historic Places in 2015.

See also

National Register of Historic Places listings in northern Puerto Rico

Notes

References

Toa Baja, Puerto Rico
1710s establishments in the Spanish West Indies
Churches on the National Register of Historic Places in Puerto Rico
Spanish Colonial architecture in Puerto Rico
Archaeological sites on the National Register of Historic Places in Puerto Rico
Roman Catholic churches in Puerto Rico
Roman Catholic churches completed in 1718
1718 establishments in the Spanish Empire
18th-century establishments in Puerto Rico
Church ruins